Cyril L. "Cheddy" Thompson (July 4, 1915 – August 26, 1972) was a Canadian ice hockey coach. He was the head coach of Colorado College after World War II during their most successful era and led the team to their first national title in 1950.

Career
Cheddy Thompson attended Gonzaga University during the period when the Bulldogs supported an ice hockey program, playing for the team from 1939–1941. After graduating Thompson joined the military during the Second World War and was assigned to 2nd Air Force HQ in Colorado Springs. With the war winding down Colorado College was among a number of schools who restarted (or began) Division I programs with theirs rekindling in the 1944–45 season. With the war over by the start of the next season, and Colorado College in need of a full-time coach, Thompson was chosen to head the program.

Thompson's first season finished disappointingly with a 3–8 mark, but he soon got the Tigers on track with a then-school record 14 wins the next season. The following year (1947–48) the NCAA began holding a tournament to determine the ice hockey National Champion. With a 19–7 record, Thompson's Tigers were one of four teams invited to participate, facing off against Dartmouth and losing the semifinal 8–4. With a 14–6–1 mark the next season Colorado College returned to the national tournament (along with all three others from the previous year) and were defeated twice, first by Boston College in the semifinal (7–3) and then by Michigan in the first consolation game (10–4).

The 1949–50 season saw more of the same during the regular season with the Tigers finishing 16–5–1 and heading to their third consecutive tournament (along with Michigan and BC) but were finally able to win their first playoff game by avenging last year's loss to Boston College, winning 10–3 in the semifinal. In the final against Boston University the Terriers jumped out to an early lead, ending the first period ahead 1–0 but once the second frame began the Tigers took over the game, scoring 3 goals in the middle period and scoring a still-NCAA record 10 goals in the third to win 13–4. Despite the 23 goals scored in two games, Ralph Bevins of Boston University was chosen as the Tournament Most Outstanding Player.

Thompson got the Tigers back to the tournament in each of the next two seasons, going 1–3 in the championship, with 1951–52 seeing a major change as the Tigers became a founding member of the MCHL (a predecessor to the WCHA) and won the conference title the first season. Thompson received the Spencer Penrose Award the same year from the American Collegiate Hockey Association. The Tigers missed the tournament for two consecutive years before returning in 1955. While the Tigers dropped the title tilt to rival Michigan, a bigger loss came after the season when Thompson resigned as head coach.

Honors
While a fan favorite in Colorado Springs, Thompson wouldn't receive many accolades for his work until after his death in 1972, being inducted into the Colorado Springs Sports Hall of Fame in 2000 and the Colorado College Athletic Hall of Fame twice: first as a member of the 1950 championship team in 1998 and then for his coaching career in 2013.

Head coaching record

References

External links

Canadian ice hockey coaches
Colorado College Tigers men's ice hockey coaches
1915 births
1972 deaths
Ice hockey people from Saskatchewan
Gonzaga Bulldogs men's ice hockey players